Jan Malm (23 May 1950 – 8 April 2004) was CEO of the Swedish telecom company Ericsson in China 2000–2004.

Biography
Jan Malm was born in Ödeshög, Sweden, in 1950, and graduated as civil engineer from the University of Linköping. He worked for many years for the company Teli AB in Nynäshamn, Sweden, and thereafter for the Swedish company Ericsson AB, both in Sweden and in China. He was also a captain and reserve officer (fighter controller) in the Swedish Air Force. He died unexpectedly of a heart collapse on April 8, 2004, during a running exercise in a gym in central Beijing.

1950 births
2004 deaths
20th-century Swedish engineers
Linköping University alumni
Ericsson people
Swedish Air Force officers